The Convent has been the official residence of the governor of Gibraltar since 1728. It was originally a convent of Franciscan friars, hence its name, and was built in 1531, and heavily rebuilt during the 18th and 19th centuries.

The dining room at the Convent has the most extensive display of heraldry in the Commonwealth of Nations.

History

Franciscan friars arrived in Gibraltar during the reign of Charles I of Spain. They were granted a plot of land in the area known at the time as La Turba where the poorer people of Gibraltar lived. A church and a friary were built in 1531. The entrance was at the back (what is now Governor's Lane). It stretched up to the area that is occupied today by the John Mackintosh Hall.

After the capture of Gibraltar by an Anglo-Dutch fleet in the name of the Archduke Charles, the Franciscan friars did not follow the exodus of the Spanish population and remained in Gibraltar, at least for some years (their presence was recorded in 1712). The Franciscan friary was later taken over as the residence of the British governors in 1728 and has remained so ever since.

The building was heavily rebuilt during the 18th and 19th centuries in the Georgian style with Victorian elements.

In 1903 Gibraltar received its first visit from a British Monarch when Edward VII arrived to name the new No. 3 Dock of Gibraltar Harbour after himself. He received complaints that as head of the Church of England he should visit a Roman Catholic institution like The Convent. The King requested that the building should be called Government House. The new dry docks attracted Queen Alexandra in HMY Victoria and Albert in 1906 and the Prince and Princess of Wales the following year to name dock number two and then one after themselves.

Overview

The Convent is situated towards the southern end of Main Street. A guard mount takes place at the main entrance a few days a week conducted by soldiers of the Royal Gibraltar Regiment. The Changing of the Guard is also conducted outside the Convent a few times a year.

King's Chapel

The garrison church adjacent to the Convent, part of the original Franciscan complex, was renamed Queen's Chapel during Queen Victoria's reign, but Queen Elizabeth II restored it back to its original title. Inside the chapel, beneath the colours of several British regiments, lie the remains of the wife of the Spanish governor of 1648, together with those of two British governors: General Charles O'Hara and Lieutenant-General Colin Campbell, who were laid to rest in 1802 and 1814, respectively.

Ghost story

The convent is supposedly haunted by the ghost of a nun, known as "Lady in Grey" who is said to roam the corridor outside one of the guest rooms. It is said that she considers it to be her room, as she was walled up alive in it.

There are various versions of the "Grey Lady" story, the most popular being that she was the daughter of an affluent Spanish family who had married against her father's wishes. When he learnt of it, he placed her in the "Convent of Santa Clara" situated in the Main Street, where under the eyes of the Mother Superior, the girl was forced to take her vows and become a nun. Her lover was not discouraged; he joined the Franciscan Order and settled in the Convent. The couple are said to have met in the confessional of the King's Chapel where they hatched plans for their escape.

On the night of their escape they made their way to the harbour where a boat was waiting for them. However, the alarm was raised and in the ensuing chase the lover fell into the water and drowned. The bride was arrested for breaking her vows and as punishment was walled up alive in one of the rooms in the Convent.

See also
 Architecture of Gibraltar
 Governor of Gibraltar
 History of Gibraltar
 Political development in modern Gibraltar

Notes

References

External links

Virtual tour of the Convent

Religious buildings and structures completed in 1531
Government buildings completed in the 19th century
Buildings and structures in Gibraltar
Government Houses of the British Empire and Commonwealth
Official residences in Gibraltar
Gibraltar
1500s establishments in Gibraltar
Tourist attractions in Gibraltar
1531 establishments in Spain